Orange Glen High School (OGHS) is one of the five public high schools in the Escondido Union School District in Escondido, California.  It was established in 1962. The school earned the California Distinguished School Award in 2007.

In the 2005-06 school year Orange Glen High School served 2,370 students from grades 9 to 12. It has six academic counselors. The school's yearbook is known as The Torch. The Musket school newspaper is part of the High School National Ad Network.

Athletics
Orange Glen High School is a Division II school and a member of the Valley League. In the fall (August), student athletes may participate in cross country, football, girls tennis, girls volleyball, girls golf, marching band and cheerleading. In the winter (November), students can participate in boys and girls basketball, boys and girls soccer, girls water polo, wrestling, cheerleading, drumline and marching band. In the spring (February), boys volleyball, baseball, softball, boys golf, boys tennis, boys and girls track, drumline, drum major, Winter Guard and Concert Band.

Titles won
In 1999, the boys basketball team won the CIF Division II championships 45-74 over Serra High School.

In 2014, boys basketball became the CIF Champions winning 60-38 against Tri-City Christian 

The girls basketball team won the Division II title in 2002. They beat Mount Miguel High School 52-41

Girls Cross Country won the Division I title in 1995. As for individual champions, Pauline Stehly won the 3A title in 1983.

The football team won the 1967 county title under coach Dick Disney, after whom the school's stadium was named Dick Disney Field.

In 2007, the boys soccer team won the CIF San Diego Section Division II championships. It was the first CIF banner for the boys soccer team.  They won their second CIF title on March 6, 2010, under the guidance of coach Colin Garon, defeating Westview High School 6-5 on penalty kicks after drawing 1-1 in regulation.  Senior Adrian Gutierrez was named CIF Player of the Year.
They were listed league champions in 2008, 2012, & 2013 having an undefeated season in 2012 & 2013.

In 2009 and 2010, the Orange Glen Drum Majors earned the Field Conducting Championship in World Drum Major Association (WDMA.)  Since 2009, they have taken 4 field conducting championships and 7 total Championship accolades.  The group was represented in the top 5 at Championships from 2009-2013 and is one of only two drum major programs to be represented in every WDMA Championship show in field conducting for 5 straight years, and the only program to be awarded at least one accolade in every Field Conducting Championship.  The program has received at least one awarded placement in every drum major competition they have attended except one (Glendora 2012)since their inception in 2009 up until 2013.

In 2016, the girls soccer team won the CIF San Diego Section Division V Championships. It is the first CIF banner for the girls soccer team. They also won the League Title for the first time in 2017 and a second time in 2019.

Other athletics history
Several notable coaches at Orange Glen include Mike Solari, current Offensive Line Coach with New York Giants NFL Hall of Famer and former Oakland Raider Fred Biletnikoff in 1982 and current Colorado State co-offensive coordinator Dave Lay in 1988 

Patriot football players to have had their numbers retired are Sean Salisbury in 2007 
Cree Morris and Lenny McGill join Sean Salisbury to have their numbers officially retired on 10-16-2015 

Cross Country athlete Andrew Piroutek competed at the NCAA Cross Country Championships In San Diego in 2006.

Tennis Coach Kevin Brown was awarded the Lifetime Distinguished Service Award by the San Diego Section CIF office in May 2015.

Boys Basketball, Coached by Chris Featherly, made it to semi-finals for the southern state championship in the 2016-17 school year.

Notable alumni
Travis Ryan, vocalist of the band Cattle Decapitation
Janese Swanson, co-developer of the Carmen Sandiego educational games, and founder of the company Girl Tech

Athletics
Ken Block, rally car driver and founder of DC Shoes
Lenny McGill, former football player and current Denver Broncos scout
Brett Salisbury, college football player and author
Sean Salisbury (1981), football player and ESPN broadcaster
Virgil Zwicker, mixed martial artist

See also 
 List of high schools in San Diego County, California

Notes

References 
North County Times
MaxPreps

External links 
 Escondido Union School District
 Escondido Unified High School District

High schools in San Diego County, California
Educational institutions established in 1964
Public high schools in California
Education in Escondido, California
1964 establishments in California